Marina Fernández Muelas (born 11 May 1996) is an Andorran footballer who plays as a midfielder for Andorran-based Spanish Women's First Division of Catalonia club ENFAF and the Andorra women's national team.

International goals

References

External links 
 
 Marina at Txapeldunak.com 

1996 births
Living people
Women's association football midfielders
Andorran women's footballers
People from Sant Julià de Lòria
Andorra women's international footballers
Andorran expatriate footballers
Andorran expatriate sportspeople in Spain
Expatriate women's footballers in Spain